SAPI may stand for:
 Speech Application Programming Interface, an API produced by Microsoft for speech recognition and speech synthesis
 Server application programming interface, an API used to interface with web servers such as Apache
 Small Arms Protective Insert, a military ballistic protection system
 Systém automatického pořizování informací (system for automatic gathering of information): SAPI-1, a computer produced in former Czechoslovakia by Tesla
 Network Service Access Point Identifier, an identifier used in GPRS (cellular data) networks.
 SaPI, a family of pathogenicity islands found in Staphylococcus aureus

Sapi may refer to:
 Sapi Safari Area, included in UNESCO World Heritage Site Mana Pools National Park, Sapi and Chewore Safari Areas
 Sapi, a nickname for the name Sapna found in the Hindi language. Usage has been documented in North Eastern Ohio.
 Bull in Indonesian, such as in the Karapan sapi event or various dishes in Indonesian cuisine

See also
 Sappi, a South African pulp and paper company